Mindaugas is a Lithuanian masculine given name and may refer to the following individuals:
Mindaugas (ca. 1203–1263), Lithuanian medieval Grand Duke of Lithuania and King of Lithuania
Mindaugas II (1864–1928), German prince who was elected King of Lithuania in 1918 but never reigned
Mindaugas Girdžiūnas (born 1989), Lithuanian basketball player
Mindaugas Grigalevičius (born 1981), Lithuanian football striker
Mindaugas Griškonis (born 1986), Lithuanian rower and Olympic competitor
Mindaugas Kalonas (born 1984), Lithuanian football midfielder
Mindaugas Katelynas (born 1983) Lithuanian  basketball power forward
Mindaugas Lukauskis (born 1979), Lithuanian basketball shooting forward and small forward
Mindaugas Malinauskas (born 1983), Lithuanian footballer goalkeeper
Mindaugas Mizgaitis (born 1979), Lithuanian wrestler and Olympic medalist
Mindaugas Murza (born 1973), Lithuanian nationalist politician
Mindaugas Panka (born 1984), Lithuanian football midfielder and defender
Mindaugas Piečaitis (born 1969), Lithuanian composer and conductor 
Mindaugas Rojus (born 1981), Lithuanian opera baritone
Mindaugas Sadauskas (born 1990), Lithuanian swimmer and Olympic competitor
Mindaugas Timinskas (born 1974), Lithuanian basketball small forward and Olympic competitor
Mindaugas Žukauskas (born 1975), Lithuanian basketball small forward, captain and manager

Other
Mindaugas Bridge, a bridge that crosses Neris River and connects Žirmūnai elderate with the Old Town of Vilnius, Lithuania

Lithuanian masculine given names